Vənlik (also, Venlik and Vannik) is a village and municipality in the Jalilabad Rayon of Azerbaijan.  It has a population of 428.

References 

Populated places in Jalilabad District (Azerbaijan)